Ryves Holt House (1665) is purportedly the oldest surviving house in the U.S. state of Delaware.  It is located at 218 Second Street in Lewes, Delaware.

The building, which has been dated to 1665 using dendrochronology, served as one of the earliest inns in the region.  It was run for a time by Philip Russell, who was "recorded as a cupbearer to William Penn". After coming to "Port Lewes" in 1721, Ryves Holt, the first Chief Justice of Sussex County, purchased the house. The Lewes Historical Society currently owns and operates the building. On December 30, 2014, the Ryves Holt House was added to the First State National Historical Park.

See also
List of the oldest buildings in Delaware

References

External links

Lewes Historical Society

Museums in Sussex County, Delaware
Historic house museums in Delaware
Houses completed in 1665
Houses in Lewes, Delaware
1665 establishments in Delaware
First State National Historical Park